El Rincón del Vago  (Spanish for "Lazybones's corner") is a Spanish-language web portal.

Established in 1998 and held by Orange España, it offers a public access repository of information, notably monographs. It is very popular among students. Teachers use it as well to discover plagiarism.

References

Orange S.A.
Web portals
Free-content websites
Spanish-language websites
Internet properties established in 1998